Daag may refer to:

Entertainment
 Daag (1952 film), a 1952 film starring Dilip Kumar and Nimmi
 Daag (1973 film), a 1973 Hindi film starring Rajesh Khanna and Sharmila Tagore
 Daag (1999 film), a 1999 Hindi film starring Sanjay Dutt and Mahima Chaudhry
 Daag (2022 film), a Bangladeshi web film starring Mosharraf Karim, Nishat Priom and Aisha Khan Tahiya

Other uses
 Daagh Dehlvi (1831–1905), Mughal poet
 DAAG, the ICAO airport code for Houari Boumedienne Airport in Algeria
 Deputy Assistant Adjutant General, a British Army administrative officer